Milstar  (Military Strategic and Tactical Relay) is a constellation of military communications satellites in geosynchronous orbit, which are operated by the United States Space Force, and provide secure and jam-resistant worldwide communications to meet the requirements of the Armed Forces of the United States. Six spacecraft were launched between 1994 and 2003, of which five are currently operational; the third launch failed, both damaging the satellite and leaving it in an unusable orbit.

History 
Milstar Block I spacecraft, or Milstar Developmental Flight Satellite (DFS)-1 and -2, were designed with a Low Data Rate (LDR) payload in the  wing of the satellite that broadcast in the Super High Frequency (SHF) and Extremely High Frequency (EHF) ranges, and also a classified communication payload in the  wing. The DFS-1 satellite was launched on 7 February 1994 aboard the first Titan IV(401)A rocket, but with the classified  wing payload deactivated. It was followed by the DFS-2 spacecraft on 7 November 1995. DFS-2 was similar to DFS-1, but the classified payload was replaced by ballast in the form of a precision machined aluminum block to maintain the weight and balance characteristics of the satellite. Both Block I satellites (USA-99 and USA-115) are still operational as of August 2016, over 20 years since they were launched.

The four later satellites were Block II spacecraft, which featured an additional medium data-rate payload. The first Block II satellite (DFS-3m, a hybrid mix of largely Block I support systems and LDR payload and a MDR (Medium Data Rate) Block II payload) was launched on 30 April 1999, using a Titan IV(401)B rocket. Due to a database error affecting the attitude control system of the Centaur upper stage of its carrier rocket, it was placed into a lower orbit than had been planned, and damaged by deployment at excessive rates.  It could not be raised into its operational orbit due to fuel limitations. Its orbit was raised as much as possible to increase the expected lifetime and then it was permanently turned off after 10 days.  It was the third consecutive, and last, failure of a Titan IV rocket. The remaining three satellites (DFS-4, -5, and -6) were launched on 27 February 2001, 15 January 2002, and 8 April 2003.

The Milstar system consists of three segments; the space segment which consists of the six satellites, ground terminals and users, and stations to command and control the satellites. The Military Satellite Communications Systems Wing (MCSW) division of the Space and Missile Systems Center, located at Los Angeles AFB was responsible for development and acquisition of the Milstar space and mission control segments. The Electronic Systems Center at Hanscom AFB is responsible for the US Air Force portion of the terminal segment development and acquisition. The 4th Space Operations Squadron at Schriever AFB and the 148th Space Operations Squadron at Vandenberg AFB are responsible for providing real-time satellite control and communications payload management.

In August 2010 control of the Milstar system was transferred to the Advanced Extremely High Frequency program, in preparation for the launch of the first AEHF satellite, USA-214. Advanced Extremely High Frequency satellites are intended to replace Milstar.

Characteristics
Milstar satellites provide secure, jam resistant, worldwide communications to meet the requirements of the United States military. They were built by Lockheed Martin Missiles and Space Corporation, at a cost of US$800 million each. Each satellite has a design life of 10 years. Six were built, of which five reached their operational geosynchronous orbits, and remain in service. Launches were made using Titan IV rockets with Centaur upper stages, and all six occurred from Space Launch Complex 40 at the Cape Canaveral Air Force Station. The satellites are designed to provide communications which are hard to detect and intercept, and to be survivable in the event of nuclear warfare.

Both Block I and Block II satellites provide low data-rate communications at bandwidths between 75 bit/s and 2,400 bit/s, whilst the Block II spacecraft can also provide medium data-rate communications between 4.8 kbit/s and 1.544 Mbit/s. The satellites' uplinks operate in the Q band, while their downlinks operate within the K band. The uplink corresponds to the extremely high frequency band while downlink corresponds to the super high frequency radio band.

Spacecraft

See also
Advanced Extremely High Frequency
Defense Satellite Communications System 
Transformational Satellite Communications System
Wideband Global SATCOM system

References

 King, Mak and Riccio, Michael J. Military Satellite Communications: Then and Now. Crosslinks Magazine. Aerospace Corp. Spring, 2010.

External links
U.S. Air Force fact sheet on MILSTAR
MILSTAR 3 / Advanced Extremely High Frequency (AEHF)

Communications satellites
Post–Cold War military equipment of the United States
Lockheed Martin satellites and probes
Military space program of the United States
Equipment of the United States Space Force
Military equipment introduced in the 1990s

ja:アメリカ軍の衛星通信#MILSTAR